Francisco Andrés Sierralta Carvallo (born 6 May 1997) is a Chilean professional footballer who plays as centre-back for EFL Championship club Watford and the Chile national team. He started his career with Universidad Católica in 2015 and then played for Italian clubs in his career.

Club career
Sierralta began his career with Universidad Católica and made his debut in the Chile Cup against Barnechea on 8 July 2015. He made his league debut on 26 September, replacing Marco Medel in the final minutes against Huachipato.

In August 2017, Sierralta joined Udinese and was loaned to Parma. Sierralta's loan was extended for another year on 7 August 2018, having achieved promotion to Serie A during his first year with the club.

On 11 January 2020, Sierralta joined Serie B club Empoli on loan until 30 June 2020.

On 9 September 2020, Sierralta joined Championship club Watford on a three-year contract. He scored his first goal for Watford in a 4–1 win against Rotherham United on 16 March 2021.

International career
Along with Chile U20, he won the L'Alcúdia Tournament in 2015.

Career statistics

Honours
Universidad Católica
Primera División de Chile: 2016 Clausura

Chile U20
 L'Alcúdia International Tournament (1): 2015

References

External links

Living people
1997 births
Footballers from Santiago
People from Santiago Province, Chile
Association football central defenders
Chilean footballers
Chile international footballers
Chile under-20 international footballers
2021 Copa América players
Chilean Primera División players
La Liga players
Serie B players
Serie A players
English Football League players
Premier League players
Club Deportivo Universidad Católica footballers
Granada CF footballers
Club Deportivo Palestino footballers
Udinese Calcio players
Parma Calcio 1913 players
Empoli F.C. players
Watford F.C. players
Chilean expatriate footballers
Chilean expatriate sportspeople in Spain
Expatriate footballers in Spain
Chilean expatriate sportspeople in Italy
Expatriate footballers in Italy
Chilean expatriate sportspeople in England
Expatriate footballers in England